Wickes High School was a comprehensive public high school located in Wickes, Arkansas, United States. The school provided secondary education for students in grades 7 through 12 serving rural, distant communities of Polk County, Arkansas, primarily Wickes and Grannis. It was one of five public high schools in Polk County and one of three high schools administered by the Cossatot River School District.

Prior to July 1, 2010, Wickes High School was part of the former Wickes School District; on that date, the Wickes School District merged with the Van Cove School District to form the Cossatot River School District.

Academics 
The course of study follows the Smart Core curriculum developed by the Arkansas Department of Education (ADE), which requires students complete at least 22 units prior to graduation. Students complete coursework and exams and may take Advanced Placement (AP) courses and exam with the opportunity to receive college credit. Wickes High School is accredited by the ADE.

Athletics 
The Wickes High School mascot and athletic emblem is the Warrior with blue and white serving as the school colors.

The Wickes Warriors compete in interscholastic activities within the 1A Classification, the state's smallest classification administered by the Arkansas Activities Association. The Warriors play within the 1A Region 7 West Conference. The Hornets participate in golf (boys/girls), bowling (boys/girls), basketball (boys/girls), cheer, and track (boys/girls).

References 

Public high schools in Arkansas
Public middle schools in Arkansas
Schools in Polk County, Arkansas
Defunct schools in Arkansas
2013 disestablishments in Arkansas
Educational institutions disestablished in 2013